Sherlock Holmes in the 22nd Century is an animated television series in which Sherlock Holmes is brought back to life in the 22nd century. The series is a co-production by DIC Entertainment, L.P. and Scottish Television Enterprises and was nominated for a Daytime Emmy for Special Class Animated Program.

Overview 
The concept for the series was created by Sandy Ross, a Scottish Television executive, who came up with the idea while skiing in Aspen, Colorado in January 1996. DIC Productions and Scottish Television had previously worked together to create other series and this continued the trend. Some issues were raised about language carrying different connotations between cultures, but alternative action and dialogue were used to overcome this. The series was originally planned to be called Sherlock Holmes in the 21st Century, but as the planned air date of September 1998 was near the new millennium, the show's name was changed.

Les Studios Tex was also confirmed to be working on the series, although they are not credited in the final product.

Plot
Set in the 22nd century in New London, Inspector Beth Lestrade of New Scotland Yard is chasing the grotesquely deformed French rogue geneticist Martin Fenwick, when she realizes that his companion is none other than the 19th century criminal mastermind Professor James Moriarty. She then discovers that this is not the original Moriarty, but rather a clone created from cells taken from his corpse, which Sherlock Holmes had buried in a Swiss ice cave after Moriarty's death in 1891. Lestrade knows that Holmes died of natural causes many years later and that his corpse is preserved in a glass-walled, honey-filled coffin in the basement of New Scotland Yard. She takes the body from the basement and delivers it to biologist Sir Evan Hargreaves (who resembles Holmes' creator, Sir Arthur Conan Doyle), who has just invented a process of cellular rejuvenation. Hargreaves uses his process to return life and youth to Holmes's body so that the detective can again battle Moriarty. Holmes also returns to his old Baker Street rooms, which had been preserved as a museum. Lestrade's compudroid reads the original journals of Dr. John H. Watson and assumes his name, face, voice, and mannerisms in order to assist Holmes in both his crime-solving duties and his difficult assimilation to Great Britain in the 22nd century.

During the series, Holmes and Watson often work on retainer for New Scotland Yard, with Beth as their supervising officer and Chief Inspector Charles Grayson as hers, but they also work for private citizens. They are often assisted by the new Baker Street Irregulars: the football player Wiggins, the Cockney Deidre, and the paraplegic Tennyson, who communicates through electronic beeps (which Holmes understands after learning about 22nd century advances in technology and Morse code). The primary villains are Moriarty and Fenwick (who Moriarty has manipulated into being his loyal henchman), appearing as they do in almost half of the produced episodes.

Each episode is inspired by one of the literary works of Sir Arthur Conan Doyle. Many of these are direct rewrites of the original stories—such as "The Adventure of the Empty House", "The Adventure of the Speckled Band", "The Five Orange Pips", "The Red-Headed League", and "The Adventure of the Engineer's Thumb"—while others are drastically different from the stories on which they are based.

Visually, the series is a blend of traditional 2-D and 3-D CGI animation.

Voice cast
 Jason Gray-Stanford as Sherlock Holmes: The Great Detective himself, Holmes was brought back in the 22nd century to combat the clone of his nemesis, Professor Moriarty. Despite initial trouble with adapting to the era, Holmes acclimatizes and uses his knowledge of the future to often help his allies out of death traps.   
 John Payne as Dr. John H. Watson: A compudroid that initially worked as Lestrade's assistant. He later read the original Dr. John H. Watson's journals and was able to emulate his persona from them. He currently resides at 221B Baker Street with Holmes.
 Akiko Morison as Inspector Beth Lestrade: A descendant of Inspector G. Lestrade, Holmes' old ally from Scotland Yard. Often annoyed with Holmes' constant disregard for protocol, she nonetheless appreciates his continued help, despite direct orders from Grayson.
 Viv Leacock as Wiggins, leader of the new Baker Street Irregulars. Wiggins was once a football player, but has since retired from the profession due to an injury. He has shown intelligence and reasoning skills that were enough to impress even Holmes. 
 Jennifer Copping as Deidre, another of the Irregulars, who is a fashionable young woman with a Cockney accent. In contrast to the more outlandish rest of the cast, she provides the perspective of a more typical member of New London society.
 Richard Newman as Professor James Moriarty: A clone of the original created by Fenwick, hoping to use him as a brilliant servant. However, Moriarty was able to outwit Fenwick and reverse the roles on him, taking this new lease on life to re-create his old criminal empire.
 Ian James Corlett as Martin Fenwick: A deformed and insane French scientist who specializes in cloning. He created a clone of Moriarty to do his bidding, but he ended up being reduced to the lackey in their relationship. Whether he does this because he knows that Moriarty could devise a horrible and painful way to dispose of him, or because he has been brainwashed by Moriarty, has never been revealed.
 William Samples as Chief Inspector Charles Grayson: Lestrade's superior who distrusts Holmes and is reluctant of him interfering with his cases, due to him being born at a different age.
 Jo Bates as a newscaster who appears on broadcasts in the episodes, which provide clues in much the same way newspapers did in the original stories.

Additional voice cast

List of episodes
The show premiered in the United Kingdom in the late spring of 1999 on CITV and then premiered in the fall in the United States. In the U.S., the series was split into two seasons, with the first airing on Fox Kids, and the other which was planned to air on Kids' WB in 2001, but instead aired on broadcast syndication. All 26 episodes were originally planned to air in the United States on PAX alongside fellow-DIC show Archie's Weird Mysteries as part of an hour-long block, but was moved to air on Fox Kids.

Only the first 13 episodes were broadcast on ITV in 1999, ending with "The Musgrave Ritual" in August. In the U.S., 17 episodes were broadcast on Fox Kids starting in September 1999, in a different order, and ending with "The Man with the Twisted Lip". The remaining episodes aired in 2001 in the U.S.

Home media releases
In September 1999, Vision Video and Universal Studios Home Video UK released a VHS tape of the series in the United Kingdom. It contained the first six episodes of the series in their original production order.

In 2002, Lions Gate Home Entertainment and Trimark Home Video released Sherlock Holmes in the 22nd Century: The Fall and Rise of Sherlock Holmes, a VHS/DVD which, like the U.K. VHS, consisted of the first three episodes in a feature-length format. The episode "The Sign of Four" was also included on the DVD version.

In 2003, Sterling Entertainment released another VHS/DVD of the series titled Sherlock Holmes in the 22nd Century: Out of This World. The release contained the episodes "The Sign of Four", "The Adventures of the Dancing Men" and "Silver Blaze", with the episode "The Gloria Scott" as a bonus episode on the DVD.

In February 2012, Mill Creek Entertainment released Sherlock Holmes in the 22nd Century...On the Case on DVD, consisting of the first 10 episodes of the series in their original production order, and also containing an episode of Stargate Infinity. They also released a DVD box set called Sherlock Holmes in the 22nd Century: The Complete 26 Episode Series, containing all 26 episodes alongside five bonus episodes from other Cookie Jar owned series. Mill Creek re-released the complete series on DVD in Region 1 as Sherlock Holmes in the 22nd Century: The Complete Series in April 2018. This version also came with a digital download code.

References

External links
 
Sherlock Holmes in the 22nd Century on STV Player

1990s American animated television series
2000s American animated television series
1990s American science fiction television series
2000s American science fiction television series
1990s British animated television series
2000s British animated television series
1990s British science fiction television series
2000s British science fiction television series
1999 American television series debuts
1999 British television series debuts
2001 American television series endings
2001 British television series endings
Television series set in the 22nd century
American children's animated action television series
American children's animated adventure television series
American children's animated mystery television series
American children's animated science fiction television series
British children's animated action television series
British children's animated adventure television series
British children's animated mystery television series
British children's animated science fiction television series
English-language television shows
Fox Kids
ITV children's television shows
Sherlock Holmes pastiches
Sherlock Holmes television series
Television series by DIC Entertainment
Television shows produced by Scottish Television
Television series by DHX Media
Television shows set in London